Ubon Ratchathani, often shortened to Ubon, is one of Thailand's seventy-six provinces lies in lower northeastern Thailand also called Isan. Neighboring provinces are (from west clockwise) Sisaket, Yasothon, and Amnat Charoen. To the north and east it borders Salavan and Champasak of Laos, to the south  Preah Vihear of Cambodia.

Geography

At Khong Chiam the Mun River, the biggest river of the Khorat Plateau, joins the Mekong, which forms the northeastern boundary of Thailand with Laos. It is called "Maenam Song Si" or the "Mun River alluvium" because the brown water from Mekong River mixes with the blue water of the Mun.

The area in the Dângrêk Mountains where the borders of the three countries, Thailand, Laos, and Cambodia meet is promoted as the "Emerald Triangle", in contrast to the "Golden Triangle" in the north of Thailand. "Emerald" refers to the largely intact monsoon forests there.

History
The city was founded in the late 18th century by Thao Kham Phong, descendant of Phra Wo and Phra Ta, who escaped from King Siribunsan of Vientiane into Siam Kingdom during the reign of King Taksin the Great. Later Thao Kham Phong was appointed to be “Phra Pathum Wongsa" The first ruler of Ubon Ratchathani. In 1792, Ubon Ratchathani became a province, and was also the administrative center of the monthon Isan. 

Until 1972, Ubon Ratchathani was the largest province of Thailand by area. Yasothon was split off from Ubon Ratchathani in 1972, followed by Amnat Charoen in 1993.

Before it became a province. Ubon Ratchathani was the administrative center of the monthon Isan, of which monthon Ubon was split off. In 1925 it became part of monthon Nakhon Ratchasima, with the abolishment of the monthon in 1933 the province became a first level subdivision of the country.

Symbols
The provincial seal shows a lotus flower in a pond. This alludes to the meaning of the name of the province, which translates to 'royal city of the lotus flower'. The provincial flower is the lotus (Nymphaea lotus). The provincial tree is the Yang-na (Dipterocarpus alatus).

Economy
Ubon Ratchathani is the nation's leading rice-producing province. It earns more than 10 billion baht a year from rice sales.

Ubonratchathani has many coffee cafe around the city in both downtown and rural area. This business runs the city lively. People tend to hangout on the weekend.
Ubonratchathani has many coffee cafe around the city in both downtown and rural area. This business runs the city lively. People tend to hangout on the weekend.

National parks

Ubon Ratchathani boasts the following national parks:
 Phu Chong–Na Yoi National Park is in the mountainous southern region of the province.
 Kaeng Tana National Park is in Khong Chiam District.
 Pha Taem National Park, plateaus and hills dominate the park landscape. The sheer cliffs here are a result of earthquakes. The interesting places in the national park are Pha Taem and Pha Kham. On the cliffs surfaces are numerous prehistoric cave paintings from 3,000 to 4,000 years ago. These paintings depict scenes of fishing, rice farming, figures of people, animals, hands and geometric designs that depict life during the pre-historic time and reflect the ancient lifestyle of the people who lived there.
There are four national parks, along with two other national parks, make up region 9 (Ubon Ratchathani) of Thailand's protected areas.
 Phu Chong–Na Yoi National Park, 
 Pha Taem National Park, 
 Khao Phra Wihan National Park, 
 Kaeng Tana National Park,

Wildlife sanctuaries
There are two wildlife sanctuaries, along with four other wildlife sanctuaries, make up region 9 (Ubon Ratchathani) of Thailand's protected areas.
 Buntharik–Yot Mon Wildlife Sanctuary, 
 Yot Dom Wildlife Sanctuary,

Health 
The main hospital of Ubon Ratchathani province is Sunpasitthiprasong Hospital.

Transportation

Air

Ubon Ratchathani is served by Ubon Ratchathani Airport.

Rail
Ubon Ratchathani Railway Station is the main railway station in Ubon Ratchathani.

Education
Ubon Ratchathani province is the home of Ubon Ratchathani University.

Administrative divisions

Provincial government

The province is divided into 25 districts (amphoe). The districts are further divided into 219 subdistricts (tambons) and 2,469 villages (mubans).

Municipalities

Local government
As of 26 November 2019 there are: one Ubon Ratchathani Provincial Administration Organisation and 60 municipal (thesaban) areas in the province. Ubon Ratchathani has city (thesaban nakhon) status. Chaeramae, Det Udom, Phibun Mangsahan and Warin Chamrap have town (thesaban mueang) status. Further 54 subdistrict municipalities (thesaban tambon). The non-municipal areas are administered by 179 Subdistrict Administrative Organisations - SAO (ongkan borihan suan tambon).

Gallery

Sister cities
 Bujumbura, Burundi
 Kigali, Rwanda
 Kinshasa, Democratic Republic of the Congo
 Paris, France

See also
Human achievement index (HAI), by National Economic and Social Development Board

References

External links 

 Tourism Authority of Thailand (TAT): Ubon Ratchathani

 Website of province (Thai only)

 
Provinces of Thailand